Four ships of the United States Navy have been named USS McKee.

Three were named in honor of Lt. Hugh W. McKee:
, was a  during World War I
, was a  during World War II

The fourth was named in honor of RADM Andrew McKee:
, was an  launched in 1980 and decommissioned in 1999

United States Navy ship names